Plasmodium venkataramiahii is a parasite of the genus Plasmodium.

Like all Plasmodium species P. achromaticum has both vertebrate and insect hosts. The vertebrate hosts for this parasite are birds.

Clinical features and host pathology 
This species infects crows (Corvus splendens).

References 

venkataramiahii